Percy Wilfred "Red" Griffiths (March 30, 1893 – June 12, 1983) was an American football player and coach and politician.  He played college football at Pennsylvania State College—now known as Pennsylvania State University and professionally for one season in the National Football League (NFL) with the Canton Bulldogs.  Griffiths was the head football coach at Marietta College in Marietta, Ohio from 1921 to 1926 and Dickinson College in Carlisle, Pennsylvania from 1929 to 1930, compiling a career college football coaching record of 16–41–10.  He was the mayor of Marietta, Ohio from 1938 and 1939 and served three terms in the United States House of Representatives, representing Ohio's 15th congressional district from 1943 to 1949.

Early life and  playing career
After serving in the United States Navy during World War I, "Red" Griffiths attended Bloomsburg Normal School. He moved on to Pennsylvania State College where he played college football as a guard for Hugo Bezdek's undefeated 1920 team.  Griffith was named to the 1920 College Football All-America Team. He also lettered in lacrosse for the Nittany Lions and earned a Bachelor of Science in chemistry from  Penn State in 1921. He played one professional season (1921) with the Canton Bulldogs of the National Football League (NFL).

Coaching career

Marietta
Griffiths was the athletic director and coached football, basketball and baseball at Marietta College in Marietta, Ohio from 1921 to 1927. He coached football at Marietta from 1921 until the end of the 1926 season, accumulating a record of 14–28–7.  While at Marietta, he also coached men's basketball from 1922 until 1927.

Dickinson
Griffiths was the 21st head football coach at Dickinson College in Carlisle, Pennsylvania, serving for two seasons, from 1929 to 1930, and compiling a record of 2–13–3.

Political career and later life
Griffiths continued his education at Columbia University, graduating in 1930. He served as Marietta's mayor from 1938 to 1939 and later represented Washington County, Ohio and Ohio's 15th congressional district in the 78th, 79th, and 80th U.S. Congresses (1943–1949).  Griffiths retired to Clearwater, Florida in 1952, where he lived until his death at the age of 90, in 1983.

References

External links
 
 

1893 births
1983 deaths
20th-century American politicians
American athlete-politicians
American football guards
United States Navy personnel of World War I
Basketball coaches from Pennsylvania
Bloomsburg Huskies football players
Canton Bulldogs players
Columbia University alumni
Dickinson Red Devils football coaches
Marietta Pioneers athletic directors
Marietta Pioneers baseball coaches
Marietta Pioneers football coaches
Marietta Pioneers men's basketball coaches
Mayors of places in Ohio
Penn State Nittany Lions football coaches
Penn State Nittany Lions football players
Penn State Nittany Lions men's lacrosse players
People from Lackawanna County, Pennsylvania
Players of American football from Pennsylvania
Politicians from Marietta, Ohio
Lacrosse players from Pennsylvania
Sportspeople from Marietta, Ohio
United States Navy sailors
Republican Party members of the United States House of Representatives from Ohio